Xenarchus (Ancient Greek: Ξέναρχος) was a Greek comic poet of the Middle Comedy. None of his plays have survived, but Athenaeus preserves several quotations from his plays in the Deipnosophistae.

Surviving titles and fragments
The following eight titles, along with associated fragments, of Xenarhus' work have survived:

 Boucolion
 The Pentathlete
 Porphyra
 Priapus
 Scythians
 Sleep
 The Soldier
 Twins

References

Ancient Greek dramatists and playwrights
Greek poets
Middle Comic poets